Heteroconchia is a taxonomic infraclass of saltwater clams, marine bivalve molluscs, belonging to the subclass Autobranchia

This infraclass includes the edible clams, the cockles and the Venus clams.

Description
These bivalves are distinguished by having the two halves of the shell equally sized (i.e, they are equivalved) and having a few cardinal teeth separated from a number of long lateral teeth. Their shells lack a nacreous layer, and the gills are lamellibranch in form. Most species have a siphon.

Orders and families 
The following tree is their info which has been updated with the latest information from the World Register of Marine Species:

Infraclass: Heteroconchia

Unclassified family: †Lipanellidae
Subterclass: Archiheterodonta
Order: †Actinodontida
Superfamily: †Amnigenioidea
Family: †Amnigeniidae
Family: †Montanariidae
Family: †Zadimerodiidae
 Superfamily: †Anodontopsoidea
 Family: †Actinodontidae
 Family: †Anodontopsidae
 Family: †Baidiostracidae
 Family: †Cycloconchidae
 Family: †Intihuarellidae
 Family: †Redoniidae
 Superfamily: †Nyassoidea
 Family: †Nyassidae
 Superfamily: †Oriocrassatelloidea
 Family: †Crassatellopsidae
 Family: †Oriocrassatellidae
 Superfamily: †Palaeomuteloidea
 Family: †Palaeomutelidae
Order: Carditida
Unclassified family: †Archaeocardiidae
Unclassified family: †Eodonidae
Superfamily: Carditoidea
 Family: †Cardiniidae
Family: Carditidae
Family: Condylocardiidae
Superfamily: Crassatelloidea
Family: †Aenigmoconchidae
Family: Astartidae
Family: Crassatellidae
Family: †Myophoricardiidae
Subterclass: Euheterodonta
Unassigned Euheterodonta
Superfamily: †Babinkoidea
Superfamily: †Orthonotoidea
Superorder: Anomalodesmata
Superfamily: Clavagelloidea
Family: Clavagellidae
Family: Penicillidae
Superfamily: Cuspidarioidea
Family: Cuspidariidae
Family: Halonymphidae
Family: Protocuspidariidae
Family: Spheniopsidae
Superfamily: Myochamoidea
Family: Cleidothaeridae
Family: Myochamidae
Superfamily: Pandoroidea
Family: Lyonsiidae
Family: Pandoridae
Superfamily: Pholadomyoidea
Family: †Arenigomyidae
Family: †Margaritariidae
Family: Parilimyidae
Family: Pholadomyidae
Family: †Ucumariidae
Superfamily: Poromyoidea
Family: Cetoconchidae
Family: Poromyidae
Superfamily: Thracioidea
Family: †Burmesiidae
Family: Clistoconchidae
Family: Laternulidae
Family: Periplomatidae
Family: Thraciidae
Superfamily: Verticordioidea
Family: Euciroidae
Family: Lyonsiellidae
Family: Verticordiidae
 Superorder: Imparidentia
 Unassigned Imparidentia
 Unassigned Family: †Palaeocarditidae
Superfamily: Cyamioidea
Family: Cyamiidae
Family: Galatheavalvidae
Family: Sportellidae
Superfamily: Gaimardioidea
Family: Gaimardiidae
Superfamily: †Grammysioidea
Family: †Grammysiidae
Family: †Sanguinolitidae
Superfamily: †Kalenteroidea
Family: †Kalenteridae
 Order: Adapedonta
 Superfamily: †Edmondioidea
Family: †Edmondiidae
Family: †Pachydomidae
Superfamily: Hiatelloidea
Family: Hiatellidae
Superfamily: Solenoidea
Family: Pharidae
Family: Solenidae
Order: Cardiida
Superfamily: Cardioidea
Family: Cardiidae
Family: †Pterocardiidae
Superfamily: Tellinoidea
Family: Donacidae
Family: †Icanotiidae
Family: Psammobiidae
Family: †Quenstedtiidae
Family: Semelidae
Family: Solecurtidae
Family: †Sowerbyidae
Family: †Tancrediidae
Family: Tellinidae
Family: †Unicardiopsidae
Order: Galeommatida
Superfamily: Galeommatoidea
Family: Basterotiidae
Family: Galeommatidae
Family: Lasaeidae
Order: Gastrochaenida
Superfamily: Gastrochaenoidea
Family: Gastrochaenidae
Order: †Hippuritida (rudists)
Suborder: †Hippuritidina
Superfamily: †Caprinoidea
Family: †Antillocaprinidae
Family: †Caprinidae
Family: †Caprinuloideidae
Family: †Ichthyosarcolitidae
Superfamily: †Radiolitoidea
Family: †Caprinulidae
Family: †Caprotinidae
Family: †Diceratidae
Family: †Hippuritidae
Family: †Monopleuridae
Family: †Plagioptychidae
Family: †Polyconitidae
Family: †Radiolitidae
Family: †Trechmannellidae
Suborder: †Requieniidina
Superfamily: †Requienioidea
Family: †Epidiceratidae
Family: †Requieniidae
Order: Lucinida
Superfamily: Lucinoidea
Family: Lucinidae
Family: †Mactromyidae
Family: †Paracyclidae
Superfamily: Thyasiroidea
Family: Thyasiridae
Order: †Megalodontida
Superfamily: †Mecynodontoidea
Family: †Beichuaniidae
Family: †Congeriomorphidae
Family: †Mecynodontidae
Family: †Plethocardiidae
Family: †Prosocoelidae
Superfamily: †Megalodontoidea
Family: †Ceratomyopsidae
Family: †Dicerocardiidae
Family: †Megalodontidae
Family: †Pachyrismatidae
Family: †Wallowaconchidae
Order: †Modiomorphida
Superfamily: †Modiomorphoidea
Family: †Cypricardiniidae
Family: †Hippopodiumidae
Family: †Modiomorphidae
Family: †Palaeopharidae
Family: †Tusayanidae
Order: Myida
Superfamily: Dreissenoidea
Family: Dreissenidae
Superfamily: Myoidea
Family: Corbulidae
Family: Myidae
Family: †Pleurodesmatidae
Family: †Raetomyidae
Superfamily: Pholadoidea
Family: Pholadidae
Family: Teredinidae (shipworms)
Family: Xylophagaidae
Superfamily: †Pleuromyoidea
Family: †Ceratomyidae
Family: †Pleuromyidae
Family: †Vacunellidae
Order: Sphaeriida
Superfamily: Sphaerioidea
Family: †Neomiodontidae
Family: Sphaeriidae
Order: Venerida
Superfamily: †Anthracosioidea
Family: †Anthracosiidae
Family: †Ferganoconchida
Family: †Shaanxiconchidae
Superfamily: Arcticoidea
Family: Arcticidae
Family: †Pollicidae
Family: Trapezidae
Family: †Veniellidae
Superfamily: Chamoidea
Family: Chamidae
Superfamily: Cyrenoidea
Family: Cyrenidae
Family: Cyrenoididae
Family: Glauconomidae
Superfamily: Glossoidea
Family: Glossidae
Family: Kelliellidae
Family: †Lutetiidae
Family: Vesicomyidae
Superfamily: Hemidonacoidea
Family: Hemidonacidae
Superfamily: Mactroidea
Family: Anatinellidae
Family: Cardiliidae
Family: Mactridae
Family: Mesodesmatidae
Superfamily: †Palaeanodontoidea
Family: †Palaeanodontidae
Superfamily: †Prilukielloidea
Family: †Prilukiellidae
Family: †Senderzoniellidae
Superfamily: Ungulinoidea
Family: Ungulinidae
Superfamily: Veneroidea
Family: †Isocyprinidae
Family: Neoleptonidae
Family: Veneridae

Notes:

 Family †Lyrodesmatidae was classified by Bieler, Carter & Coan (2010) as uncertain Heterodonta but has since been classified as Palaeoheterodonta.
 Family †Redoniidae was classified by Bieler, Carter & Coan (2010) as uncertain Heterodonta but has since been classified more specifically as Anodontopsoidea.
 Family †Lipanellidae was classified by Bieler, Carter & Coan (2010) as uncertain Heteroconchia (a proposed infraclass of the proposed bivalve subclass Autobranchia) but has since been classified as uncertain Heterodonta.

References

Bivalve taxonomy
Mollusc subclasses